Nova Scotia  (Latin for New Scotland;) is a Canadian province located on Canada's southeastern coast. It is the most populous province in Atlantic Canada, and its capital, Halifax, is a major economic centre of the region. As of 2021, it has a population of 969,383 people.

History

Population geography

Population centres

The Halifax population centre is the largest urban area in Nova Scotia. Statistics Canada recognizes a total of 37 population centres in the province.

Municipalities
Nova Scotia has four regional municipalities.

Towns 

Nova Scotia has 26 towns, not including the former Town of Canso that dissolved to become part of Guysborough County on July 1, 2012, and the former Towns of Bridgetown and Springhill which dissolved on April 1, 2015.

Ethnic origins 
Note: the percentages do not necessarily add up to 100% as multiple responses are allowed. Ethnic origins with less than 2% of the responses are not listed.

Visible minorities and Indigenous peoples

Language

Knowledge of languages 

The question on knowledge of languages allows for multiple responses. The following figures are from the 2021 Canadian Census and the 2016 Canadian Census, and lists languages that were selected by at least 0.5 per cent of respondents.

Mother tongue 

The 2011 Canadian census showed a population of 921,727.Of the 904,285 singular responses to the census question concerning mother tongue the most commonly reported languages were: 

There were also 275 single-language responses for Turkish; 195 for Non-verbal languages (Sign languages); 30 for Malay; 100 for Bantu languages; 70 for Kurdish; 120 for Slovak; and 5 for Estonian. Figures shown are for the number of single language responses and the percentage of total single-language responses.

Religion

Migration

Immigration 

The 2021 census reported that immigrants (individuals born outside Canada) comprise 71,570 persons or 7.5 percent of the total population of Nova Scotia.

Recent immigration
The 2021 Canadian census counted a total of 21,385 people who immigrated to Nova Scotia between 2016 and 2021.

Interprovincial migration

From 1971 to 2011, Nova Scotia had a persistent negative trend in net interprovincial migration. Combined with a declining birth rate, this posed a significant demographic challenge for the province, as its population was projected to decline. The destination for Nova Scotia migrants was most often Ontario, until the turn of the 21st century when Alberta became a more popular destination; New Brunswick ranks as a distant third.

Source: Statistics Canada

Employment
As of February 2019, the unemployment rate for the province  is 6.4 percent. Halifax Regional Municipality 4.9 percent

Income

Notes

A  2011 Census data unavailable, data taken from the 2006 Census.

See also

Demographics of Canada
Population of Canada by province and territory

References

Nova Scotia
Nova Scotia society